was a Japanese violinist, philosopher, and educator and the founder of the international Suzuki method of music education and developed a philosophy for educating people of all ages and abilities. An influential pedagogue in music education of children, he often spoke of the ability of all children to learn things well, especially in the right environment, and of developing the heart and building the character of music students through their music education. Before his time, it was rare for children to be formally taught classical instruments from an early age and even more rare for children to be accepted by a music teacher without an audition or entrance examination. Not only did he endeavor to teach children the violin from early childhood and then infancy, his school in Matsumoto did not screen applicants for their ability upon entrance. Suzuki was also responsible for the early training of some of the earliest Japanese violinists to be successfully appointed to prominent western classical music organizations. During his lifetime, he received several honorary doctorates in music including from the New England Conservatory of Music (1956), and the Oberlin College Conservatory of Music, was proclaimed a Living National Treasure of Japan, and in 1993, was nominated for the Nobel Peace Prize.

Biography 
Born in 1898 in Nagoya, Japan, as one of twelve children, Shinichi Suzuki spent his childhood working at his father's violin factory (now Suzuki Violin Co., Ltd.), putting up violin soundposts. A family friend encouraged Shinichi to study Western culture, but his father felt it was beneath Suzuki to be a performer. However, in 1916 Suzuki began to teach himself to play the violin, inspired by a recording of Mischa Elman. Without access to professional instruction, he listened to recordings and tried to imitate what he heard.

When Suzuki was 26, his friend Marquis Tokugawa persuaded Suzuki's father to let him go to Germany, where Suzuki claimed to have studied under Karl Klingler. Suzuki also claimed to have spent time there under the tutelage of Albert Einstein. He also met and married Waltraud Prange (1905–2000). 

On returning to Japan, he formed a string quartet with his brothers and began teaching at the Imperial School of Music and at the Kunitachi Music School in Tokyo, and started taking an interest in developing the music education of young students in violin. 

During World War II his father's violin factory was converted into a factory to construct seaplane floats. It was bombed by American warplanes; killing one of Suzuki's brothers. Suzuki and his wife eventually evacuated to separate locations when conditions became too unsafe for her as an ex-German citizen, and the factory was struggling to operate due to a shortage of wood. Suzuki left with other family members for a mountainous region to secure wood from a geta factory, and his wife moved to a "German village" where Germans and ex-Germans were sequestered.

Once the war was over, Suzuki was invited to teach at a new music school, and agreed on condition that he be allowed to develop the teaching of music to children from infancy and early childhood. He adopted into his family, and continued the music education of, one of his prewar students, Koji, on learning that Koji had been orphaned. Suzuki and his wife eventually reunited and moved to Matsumoto, where he continued to teach.

He was a National Patron of Delta Omicron, an international professional music fraternity.

Shinichi Suzuki died at his home in Matsumoto, Japan, on 26 January 1998, aged 99.

Controversy
Several of Suzuki's credentials, such as educational background and endorsements, have been under scrutiny. For example, official school records were found that indicate that Suzuki, playing a Handel sonata, failed his conservatory auditions for Karl Klingler.

Contributions to pedagogy 
Shinichi Suzuki's experiences as an adult beginner and the philosophies that he held during his life were recapitulated in the lessons he developed to teach his students. Schools of early childhood education have combined his philosophies and approaches with pedagogues such as Orff, Kodály, Montessori, Dalcroze, and Doman.

"First, to set the record straight, this is not a 'teaching method.' You cannot buy ten volumes of Suzuki books and become a 'Suzuki Teacher.'  Dr. Suzuki has developed a philosophy which, when understood to the fullest, can be a philosophy for living. He is not trying to create the world of violinists. His major aim is to open a world of beauty to young children everywhere that they might have greater enjoyment in their lives through the God-given sounds of music" (Hermann, 1971).

Suzuki developed his ideas through a strong belief in the ideas of "Talent Education", a philosophy of instruction that is based on the premise that talent, musical or otherwise, is something that can be developed in any child. At the 1958 National Festival, Suzuki said,  Suzuki also collaborated with other thinkers of his time, like Glenn Doman, founder of The Institutes for the Achievement of Human Potential, an organization that studies neurological development in young children. Suzuki and Doman agreed on the premise that all young children had great potential, and Suzuki interviewed Doman for his book Where Love is Deep.

Suzuki employed the following ideas of Talent Education in his music pedagogy schools:
The human being is a product of his environment.
The earlier, the better – with not only music, but all learning.
Repetition of experiences is important for learning.
Teachers and parents (adult human environment) must be at a high level and continue to grow to provide a better learning situation for the child.
The system or method must involve illustrations for the child based on the teacher's understanding of when, what, and how (Kendall, 1966).

The epistemological learning aspect, or, as Suzuki called it, the "mother tongue" philosophy, is that in which children learn through their own observation of their environment, especially in the learning of their first language. The worldwide Suzuki movement continues to use the theories that Suzuki himself put forward in the mid-1940s and has been continuously developed to this day, stemming from his encouragement of others to continue to develop and research the education of children throughout his lifetime.

He trained other teachers, who returned to their respective countries and helped to develop the Suzuki method and philosophy internationally.

Suzuki philosophy 
Suzuki Talent Education or the Suzuki Method combines a music teaching method with a philosophy that embraces the total development of the child. Suzuki's guiding principle was "character first, ability second", and that any child can learn.

Awards, honors, and nominations 
 Order of the Rising Sun, Third Class (circa 1970)
 Honorary Doctor of Music, New England Conservatory of Music (1966)
 Honorary Doctor of Music, University of Louisville (1967)
 Honorary Doctor of Music, University of Rochester Eastman School of Music (1972)
 Honorary Doctor of Music, Oberlin College Conservatory of Music (1984)
 Honorary Doctor of Music, Cleveland Institute of Music (1990)
 Honorary Distinguished Professor, North East Louisiana University (1982)
 Nobel Peace Prize Nominee (1993)

Bibliography 
Suzuki wrote a number of short books about his method and his life, several of which were translated from Japanese to English by his German born wife, Waltraud Suzuki, including
 Nurtured by Love
 Ability Development from Age Zero
 Man and Talent: Search into the Unknown
 Where Love is Deep

References

Further reading

External links
 Biography of Suzuki on the SAA
 Details on Suzuki and his method
 Suzuki Talent Education Association of Australia (Victoria) Inc
 Suzuki's photos:Suzuki1,Suzuki2, with children, teaching1,teaching2, statue

1898 births
1998 deaths
20th-century classical violinists
20th-century Japanese educators
20th-century Japanese male musicians
Educational psychologists
Japanese classical violinists
Japanese educational theorists
Japanese music educators
Japanese Roman Catholics
People from Nagoya
Progressive education
Violin pedagogues